Ernest Anderson (17 August 1877 – 22 May 1943) was an Australian rules footballer who played with Geelong in the Victorian Football League (VFL). His only game in the VFL came when he was chosen from the crowd during a game against Carlton, when Geelong were a man short.

Notes

External links 

1877 births
1943 deaths
Australian rules footballers from Victoria (Australia)
Geelong Football Club players